The Uniting Presbyterian Church in Southern Africa (UPCSA) was formed and constituted in 1999 as the outcome of the union between the Reformed Presbyterian Church in Southern Africa (RPCSA) and the Presbyterian Church of Southern Africa (PCSA).

These two churches shared the same origin dating back to the 19th century when Britain took over the Cape Colony. Their distinctive characters were that the Presbyterian Church in Southern Africa was constituted among soldiers and settlers who arrived in the Cape in 1820, spreading North into Zimbabwe and Zambia. The Reformed Presbyterian Church on the other hand was a product of Scottish missions intended for the indigenous Africans, which started at Lovedale Mission in Alice. It became autonomous in 1923.

In 1896 the first Presbyterian congregation was founded in Rhodesia at Bulawayo, and later in 1903 in Salisbury (now Harare). Now there are 2 Presbyteries in Matabeland and Mashonaland. Currently there are 10 congregations and 5,000-10,000 members.

The motto Nec tamen consumebatur is adapted from the Latin translation of Exodus 3:2 "...The Lord appeared to him in a blazing fire from the midst of a bush; and he looked, and behold, the bush was burning with fire, yet it was not consumed"

Recent History 
The UPCSA ordains both men and women as ministers and elders, a position inherited from the predecessor body, the Presbyterian Church of Southern Africa. The church defines marriage as exclusively heterosexual, between one man and one woman, and "instructs" ministers to not perform same-sex marriages. However, a church court ruled in 2015 that the church did not prohibit its ministers from blessing same-sex unions.

In 2019 the UPCSA celebrated its twentieth anniversary after having spent much of that time in forging structures of union.

Presbyteries

The Uniting Presbyterian Church in Southern Africa has over 450 congregations and 800,000 members and is divided into the following Presbyteries (regional districts):

South Africa 
 Amathole
 Central Cape
 Drakensberg
 eGoli
 eThekwini
Trans Xhariep
 Highveld
 Lekoa
 Limpopo
 Thukela
 East Griqualand
 Mthatha
 Tiyo Soga Memorial
 Tshwane
 Western Cape

Zambia 
 Copperbelt
 Munali
 M'chinga

Zimbabwe 
 Zimbabwe

Associations/Ministry Groups 
The Basis of Union is a contract that was signed in September 1999 entered into between the Presbyterian Church of Southern Africa (PCSA) and the Reformed Presbyterian Church in South Africa (RPCSA). Under this contract, the two churches would join and become one: the Uniting Presbyterian Church in Southern Africa (UPCSA).  Article 13 of the basis of union states that, as a condition of the union, both churches are to bring 4 associations each and the 8 associations would unite to form only 4 associations (one women's association, one men's association, one girl's association and one youth association). 
 The GCA (Girls' Christian Association) of RPCSA and JB (after Janet Burnside the wife of Rev. Tiyo Soga) of PCSA united to form IYZA (Inhlangano Yezintombi ZamaRhabe Amanyanayo)
The two women's associations united to form UPWF (Uniting Presbyterian Women's Fellowship)
The PMA (Presbyterian Men's Association) of PCSA and the YMG (Young Men's Guild) of RPCSA united to form MCG (Men's Christian Guild)
The two youth associations united to form UPCSA YF (Youth Fellowship).

See also

Confession of Faith
 Nicene Creed
 Apostles Creed
 Faith of the Uniting Presbyterian Church in Southern Africa. 2013
 Declaration of faith for the Church in Southern Africa. 1986

Further reading

References

External links 
 Uniting Presbyterian Church in Southern Africa

Presbyterianism in South Africa
Members of the World Communion of Reformed Churches
Members of the World Council of Churches
Christian organizations established in 1999
Presbyterian denominations in Africa
Presbyterian denominations established in the 20th century